Estúpido Cupido is a Brazilian telenovela produced by TV Globo. It aired from 25 August 1976 to 26 February 1977 at 7pm. Written by Mário Prata and directed by Régis Cardoso, it was the last Globo telenovela recorded in black-and-white, with the exception of the last two chapters, directed by Walter Avancini using the then new color technology.

It was the first telenovela written by Mário Prata. Due to the 1976 Olympic Games in Montreal, Estúpido Cupido debuted exceptionally on a Wednesday.

The telenovela was re-aired in Brazil starting in May 1979, at 2pm.

Plot 

The story takes place in the fictional city of Albuquerque, São Paulo, in the beginning of the 1960s. It revolves around the loves of youth, having as background the American music of the time: rock ballads and rock and roll. The teenagers study in the Catholic school Colégio Normal de Albuquerque, and many Nuns and Priests take part in the plot. Other subjects covered are: the prejudice suffered by a divorced woman (Olga Oliveira); the success of a rock band, Personélitis Boys, led by Antônio Ney Medeiros; Belchior, a clever but not very sane homeless man who runs an imaginary radio station daily from 11am–noon; Cabo Fidélis, a policeman; Acioly, a geologist prospecting for petroleum in the city region; and Alcides Guimarães Filho, the city mayor, owner of the Albuquerque Tênis Club where the high society of the city meet and party.

The external scenes were recorded in Itaboraí, Rio de Janeiro. With the success of the telenovela, there was a revival of the music style of the 50s and 60s, with twist dance competitions happening in several places across the country. The soundtrack album, produced by Som Livre, sold more than one million copies.

Cast

Sound tracks

National 

 "Banho de Lua (Tintarella di luna)" – Celly Campello
 "Quem É?" – Osmar Navarro
 "Diana" – Carlos Gonzaga
 "Meu Mundo Caiu" – Maysa
 "Broto Legal" – Sérgio Murilo
 "Alguém é Bobo de Alguém" – Wilson Miranda
 "Por Uma Noite" – Stradivarius
 "Ritmo da Chuva (The Rhythm of the Rain)" – Demétrius
 "Boogie do Bebê" – Tony Campello
 "Sereno" – Paulo Molin
 "Neurastênico" – Betinho & Seu Conjunto
 "Biquíni Amarelo (Itsy Bitsy Teenie Weenie Yellow Polka Dot Bikini)" – Ronnie Cord
 "Tetê" – Sylvia Telles
 "Bata Baby" – Wilson Miranda
 "Ela é Carioca" – Os Cariocas
 "Estúpido Cupido (Stupid Cupid)" – Celly Campello

International 

 "Breaking Up Is Hard to Do" – Neil Sedaka
 "Love Me Forever" – The Playing's
 "Be-Bop-A-Lula" – Gene Vincent
 "Tutti Frutti" – Little Richard
 "Ruby" – Ray Charles
 "Twilight Time" – The Platters
 "America" – Trini Lopez
 "The Twist" – Chubby Checker
 "Secretly" – Jimmy Rodgers
 "Tears on My Pillow" – Little Anthony & The Imperials
 "Misty" – Johnny Mathis
 "April Love" – Pat Boone
 "Multiplication" – Bobby Darin
 "Don't Be Cruel" – Elvis Presley
 "Petit Fleur" – Bob Crosby
 "The Green Leaves of Summer" – The Brothers Four
 "Puppy Love" – Paul Anka
 "Al di là" – Emilio Pericoli
 "Everybody Loves Somebody" – Dean Martin
 "Bye Bye Love" – The Everly Brothers

Chilean remake 

In 1995, Chilean TVN produced a remake of the same name that takes place in the city of San Andrés, instead of Albuquerque. Directed by Vicente Sabatini, it was adapted by Jorge Marchant Lazcano with Víctor Carrasco and Hugo Morales.

This soap opera has multiple leading couples and concerns two main plotlines. In one, a love triangle forms among Monica Tagle (Carolina Fadic), Anibal Donoso (Álvaro Rudolphy) and Isabel Margarita Dublé (Claudia Burr). Isabel, the spoiled daughter of the mayor who falls in love with Anibal, schemes to have him beside her.

The other story features local radio announcer Jaime Salvatierra (Francisco Reyes) and Sister Angélica (Claudia Di Girolamo), an extrovert revolutionary nun who scandalizes the town. When the soap aired, it stirred controversy among church authorities in Chile and was the subject of debate, as Angélica may have left the habit and started a relationship with Jaime.

Cast

 Claudia di Girolamo as Sister Angélica
 Francisco Reyes as Jaime Salvatierra
 Carolina Fadic as Mónica Tagle
 Álvaro Rudolphy as Aníbal Donoso
 Claudia Burr as Isabel Margarita Dublé
 Luis Alarcón as Octavio Dublé
 Jael Unger as Luz Arlegui of Dublé
 Alejandro Castillo as Alfonso Campino
 Consuelo Holzapfel as Virginia Buzeta
 Delfina Guzmán as Mother Undurraga
 Eduardo Barril as Father Urbistondo
 Ana Reeves as Sister Rebeca
 Mauricio Pesutic as Father Benítez
 Silvia Piñeiro as Carlota Meza
 Anita Klesky as Matilde Meza
 José Soza as Waldo Retamal
 Patricia Rivadeneira as Gloria Manterola
 Amparo Noguera as Marta Davis
 Álvaro Morales as Ricardo Campino
 Alejandra Fosalba as Gaby Buzeta
 Felipe Braun as Daniel Meza
 Tamara Acosta as Marisol Tagle
 Pablo Schwarz as Gonzalo Tagle
 Valentina Pollarolo as Pamela Manterola
 Juan Pablo Bastidas as Marcelo Manterola
 Remigio Remedy as Sergio Torrealba
 Óscar Hernández as Pancracio Carmona
 Ximena Rivas as Felicia Manzano
 Francisco Melo as Peter O'Kelly
 Fernando Larraín as Guillermo Sandoval
 Mario Montilles as Mister Raimundo Campino
 Mireya Véliz as Mother Guadalupe
 Jorge Hevia Jr. as Benjamín Campino

Other cast

 Héctor Noguera as Mgr
 Berta Lasala as Mabel Fuentes
 Marcelo Romo as Miguel Santa Cruz
 Luz Jiménez as Raquel of Meza
 Ana Luz Figueroa as Rocío Montes
 Pablo Ausensi as César Leiva "Cupid"
 Maité Fernández as Provincial Mother
 Jaime Davagnino as Marcial
 Sonia Mena as Aunt of Mónica's
 Pedro Villagra as Fernando

References

External links 
 

1976 telenovelas
Brazilian telenovelas
TV Globo telenovelas
1976 Brazilian television series debuts
1977 Brazilian television series endings
Portuguese-language telenovelas